Outi Mäenpää (born 24 February 1962) is a Finnish actress.

Mäenpää was born in Helsinki. She began her career in theatre as a stage actor between 1984 and 1988.

Life
Since 1989 she has appeared regularly on Finnish television, with over 40 appearances to date. She appeared in the 2006 film Saippuaprinssi, working with actors such as Mikko Leppilampi and Pamela Tola. In October 2007 she starred in the Finnish movie Musta jää (Black Ice).

Filmography
 The Match Factory Girl (1990)
 Trains'n'Roses (1998)
 Juha (1999)
 Sincerely Yours in Cold Blood (21 episodes, 2000–2005)
 Tappava Säde (2002)
 The Man Without a Past (2002)
 Bad Boys (2003)
 Black Ice (2007)
 Beyond (2010)
 The Kiss of Evil (2011)
 Call Girl (2012)
 Little Wing (2016)

References

External links
 
 

1962 births
Living people
Actresses from Helsinki
20th-century Finnish actresses
Finnish television actresses
Finnish film actresses
Finnish stage actresses
Best Supporting Actress Guldbagge Award winners
21st-century Finnish actresses